Colonia may refer to:

Arts and entertainment
Colonia (music group), a Croatian dance music group
Colonia (Autopsia album), 2002 
Colonia (A Camp album), 2009
Colonia (film), a 2015 historical romantic thriller

Places
Colonia (Roman), a Roman Empire outpost in conquered territory to secure it, and later the highest status of Roman city
Colonia del Sacramento, Uruguay
Colonia Department
Colonia, Yap, Federated States of Micronesia
Colonia, New Jersey, U.S.
Colonia, Oxnard, California, U.S.
Colonia, Tritenii de Jos, Cluj County, Romania
Colonia (Mexico), a type of neighborhood in a Mexican city
Colonia (United States), a type of community along the U.S.–Mexico border
Colonia Claudia Ara Agrippinensium, the Roman colony from which the German city of Cologne developed

Other uses
Colonia (surname), including a list of people with the name
Colonia (ship), a cable vessel that worked on the All Red Line

See also

 Colony (disambiguation)
 Kolonia (disambiguation)
 Koloneia (disambiguation)
 Kolonjë (placename)
Cologne, a city in Germany, originally Colonia Claudia Ara Agrippinensis
Colonia Dignidad, a colony of Germans and Chileans in post-World War II Chile 
Kolonia, in the Federated States of Micronesia